Shamator is a census town and district headquarter of Shamator district in the Indian state of Nagaland.

Shamator was declared district headquarter of newly carved district by Chief Minister Neiphiu Rio after understanding between Tikhir Tribal Council and Yimkhiung Tribal Council. Earlier the town was part of Shamator circle of Tuensang district.

Demographics 
The town mostly inhabited by Yimkhiung Naga and Tikhir Naga tribes.

References 

Cities and towns in Tuensang district
Hill stations in Nagaland